Events from the year 1950 in Sweden

Incumbents
 Monarch – Gustaf V (died 29 October); Gustaf VI Adolf
 Prime Minister – Tage Erlander

Events

29 October – Gustaf VI Adolf became King of Sweden, succeeding his father Gustaf V

Popular culture

Film
26 December – The White Cat released
18 September – Jack of Hearts released

Births
21 March – Anders Linderoth, football player and coach
5 April – agnetha fältskog, Swedish recording artist and entertainer
2 May – Yngve Kalin, priest and church leader
1 October – Stefan Krook, sailor.
6 December – Christina Lindberg, actress, model and journalist

Deaths

13 July – Gustaf Svensson, sailor (born 1882)
7 September – Hedda Andersson, female doctor (born 1861)
18 October – Per Bergman, sailor (born 1886)
29 October – Gustaf V, King of Sweden from 1907 to 1950 (born 1858)
29 November – Helge Ekroth, football player (born 1892).

References

 
Sweden
Years of the 20th century in Sweden